Local elections were held in seven hamlets and two charter communities in the Northwest Territories in 2019. Hamlet elections took place on December 19, while the charter communities of Tsiigehtchic and K’asho Got’ine held elections on June 17 and July 19, respectively. One additional hamlet, Tuktoyaktuk, cancelled its elections when the candidates for mayor and community council went uncontested.

Aklavik 
Turnout reached 62% with 245 out 398 registered voters casting their ballots.

Mayoral election

Council election

Enterprise 
Turnout reached 70% with 50 out 71 registered voters casting their ballots.

Mayoral election

Council election

K'asho Got'ine (Fort Good Hope) 
Turnout reached 40% with 285 out 705 registered voters casting their ballots.

Chief election

Council election

Fort Liard 
Turnout reached 38% with 120 out 320 registered voters casting their ballots.

Mayoral election

Council election

Fort McPherson 
Turnout reached 21% with 109 out 530 registered voters casting their ballots.

Council election

Referendum

Fort Resolution 
Turnout reached 68% with 232 out 342 registered voters casting their ballots.

Mayoral election

Council election

Sachs Harbour 
Turnout reached 57% with 39 out 69 registered voters casting their ballots.

Mayoral election

Council election

Tsiigehtchic 
Turnout reached 39% with 37 out 95 registered voters casting their ballots.

Council election

Tuktoyaktuk

Mayoral election

Council election

Ulukhaktok 
Turnout reached 38% with 107 out 278 registered voters casting their ballots.

Council election

References 

Municipal elections in the Northwest Territories
2019 in the Northwest Territories